HMS Stirling Castle was a 74-gun third rate ship of the line of the Royal Navy, launched on 31 December 1811 at Rochester.

Stirling Castle was sailing to the East Indies and Cormorant was sailing to the Cape of Good Hope. On the way, on 11 June, they boarded Ainsley, Brown, master, which was returning to Liverpool from Africa.

Stirling Castle became a prison ship in 1839, and was broken up in 1861.

Citations and references
Citations

References

Lavery, Brian (2003) The Ship of the Line - Volume 1: The development of the battlefleet 1650-1850. Conway Maritime Press. .

Ships of the line of the Royal Navy
Vengeur-class ships of the line
1811 ships
Ships built on the River Medway